Charles Pratt Huntington (1871–1919) was an American architect, born in  Logansport, Indiana and educated at Harvard University, from which he graduated in 1893, and the École nationale supérieure des Beaux-Arts in Paris, from which he graduated in 1901. He later moved to New York City, where he designed Audubon Terrace and several of its original buildings for his cousin Archer M. Huntington in the early 20th century. He was a member of the American Institute of Architects from 1911 to 1914.

Notable works

Further reading
 Henry F. Withey and Elsie Rathburn Withey, Biographical Dictionary of American Architects (Deceased), Los Angeles: New Age Publishing Company, 1956
Huntington family

References

19th-century American architects
Architects from New York City
People from Logansport, Indiana
Architects from Indianapolis
Harvard University alumni
American alumni of the École des Beaux-Arts
1871 births
1919 deaths
Architecture firms based in New York City